The convertible peso (sometimes given as CUC$ and informally called a cuc or a chavito) was one of two official currencies in Cuba, the other being the Cuban peso. It had been in limited use since 1994, when its value was pegged 1:1 to the United States dollar.

On 8 November 2004, the U.S. dollar ceased to be accepted in Cuban retail outlets and left the convertible peso as the only currency in circulation in many Cuban businesses. The convertible peso was, by the pegged rate, the twelfth-highest-valued currency unit in the world and the highest-valued "peso" unit.

On 22 October 2013, it was announced that the currency was to be scrapped. On 10 December 2020, it was announced that monetary unification would take effect from 1 January 2021. From that date, the CUC was no longer accepted in many Cuban businesses; it could only be exchanged in banks or CADECAs (casas de cambios), or used in certain shops, for a six-month period. On 15 June 2021, it was announced that the CUC would remain exchangeable in banks for a further six months but that no shops would accept them from 1 July. The final date for exchanging CUCs was 30 December 2021.

History

In 1981–1989, Cuba used so-called INTUR coins and cheques. Convertible foreign currency was exchanged into these cheques rather than the national currency, which could be used to buy some luxury goods not available for purchase in the national currency.

Also, from 1985, Banco Nacional de Cuba issued foreign exchange certificates of various types.

Because of the economic problems during the Special Period, the Cuban government allowed the possession of U.S. dollars (which had previously been illegal) and began selling goods and services in U.S. dollars, initially for tourism and for luxury items.. In 1994, they began issuing the convertible peso, to circulate together with the U.S. dollar.

This was separate from the Cuban peso (CUP), which was used for staple items. The Cuban peso (CUP) can be exchanged to the convertible peso (CUC) at exchange offices (CADECA) at a fixed rate. Since the early 2000s the rates have been 24 CUP to 1 CUC (sell) and 25 CUP to 1 CUC (buy); but for state bookkeeping purposes, both pesos are valued at a 1:1 rate.

On 8 November 2004, the Cuban government withdrew the U.S. dollar from circulation, citing the need to retaliate against further sanctions from the Helms–Burton Act. After a grace period ending on 14 November 2004, a 10% surcharge began to be imposed when converting U.S. dollars into convertible pesos. The change was announced some weeks beforehand, and was extended by the grace period. It has been claimed that it was because the amounts of U.S. dollars being exchanged were more than anticipated. The measure helped the Cuban government collect hard currency.

From 2014, some state-owned shops began to set the prices in both CUC and CUP, and accept payment in either. The 10% surcharge on converting US dollars was removed in July 2020.

Cuba's economic difficulties since the end of 2019 have resulted in shortages of goods in CUP and CUC stores, the opening of stores priced in US dollars and only accepting payment by cards backed by foreign currencies, the waiving of the 10% penalty for exchanging US dollars, the resumption of US dollars as unofficial medium of exchange, and the plunge in the value of the CUC below US$1 in unofficial street exchanges.

Coins
In 1994, coins were introduced in denominations of 5, 10, 25, and 50 centavos and 1 peso. The rare five-peso coin was introduced in 1999, followed by the one-centavo coin in 2000.

Banknotes
In 1994, the Central Bank of Cuba introduced notes in denominations of 1, 3, 5, 10, 20, 50, and 100 pesos. On 18 December 2006, the Central Bank introduced a new series of notes themed to "Socialist History and Achievements". The front of the notes are similar to its previous series, but on the back of the notes, instead of depicting the Cuban coat of arms on all denominations, each of the notes now has an individualized design.

CUC and U.S. dollar
Since the end of 2019 the CUC traded below  in unofficial street exchanges.

From 2005, when U.S. banknotes were exchanged, a 10% tax was applied, plus an exchange commission. The 10% tax was not applied to other currencies; From June 2020 this 10% tax on US dollars was eliminated.

See also
Central banks and currencies of the Caribbean
Economy of Cuba

References

External links
 A little introduction to Cuba's dual currency system
 Cuban convertible peso banknotes 

Convertible peso
Fixed exchange rate
Currencies introduced in 1994
Currencies of the Caribbean
2021 disestablishments in Cuba
Modern obsolete currencies
1994 establishments in Cuba